A Slot route operator is a company that owns and operates slot machines in several locations.  By providing this service, many small businesses are able to provide slot machines that they could not otherwise afford to operate.

As operators have grown, they have been able to offer linked machines to provide larger jackpots, and affinity cards to reward frequent players.

Operators are generally licensed in the same manner as a casino.  In Nevada, they are licensed and regulated by the Nevada Gaming Commission.

In the United States, slot routes are currently operated in Nevada, Montana, South Dakota, Oregon and Illinois.

Slot route operators 
Accel Entertainment
Century Gaming
JETT Gaming - Terrible Herbst
Gaming & Entertainment Management - Delaware North
Golden Route Operations - Golden Entertainment
Lattner Entertainment Group Illinois - Boyd Gaming
Prairie State Gaming - Penn National Gaming

References

Sources 
Las Vegas Review-Journal

Slot machines